The Palisade Rail Bridge is a steel through truss bridge, originally built by the Minneapolis, St. Paul and Sault Ste. Marie Railway in 1910 to cross the Mississippi River at Palisade, Minnesota.  The rail line was closed in 1985.  Today, the bridge is part of the Soo Line North ATV Trail in northern Minnesota.

See also 

 List of crossings of the Upper Mississippi River

References

External links 

 

Buildings and structures in Aitkin County, Minnesota
Soo Line Railroad
Bridges over the Mississippi River
Bridges completed in 1910
1910 establishments in Minnesota
Truss bridges in the United States
Steel bridges in the United States
Rail trail bridges in the United States
Transportation in Aitkin County, Minnesota
Off-roading